The Malaysia women's national under-21 field hockey team represents Malaysia in international field hockey matches and tournaments.

Competitive Record

Junior Hockey World Cup 
 2022 – 11th

Junior Asia Cup
1992 – ?
1996 – 5th
2000 – 6th
2008 – 5th
2012 – 5th
2015 – 5th
2021 – Cancelled
Source

Players
The following squad was announced for 2022 Women's FIH Hockey Junior World Cup:

See also
Malaysia men's national field hockey team
Malaysia women's national field hockey team

References

Under-21
Field hockey
Women's national under-21 field hockey teams